Anders Henriksson may refer to:

Anders Henriksson i Vinstorp (1870–?), Swedish politician
Anders Henriksson (poker player) (born 1981), Swedish poker player
 (1945-2016), Swedish producer and musician
Anders Henriksson (politician) (born 1961), Swedish politician and Kalmar FF chairman